is a former Japanese rugby union player who played as a prop. He spent his whole career playing for NEC Green Rockets in Japan's domestic Top League, playing over 65 times. He was named as a backup player for Japan for the 2007 Rugby World Cup. He did though make six appearances for Japan.

References

External links
itsrugby.co.uk profile

1982 births
Living people
People from Ibaraki Prefecture
Sportspeople from Ibaraki Prefecture
Japanese rugby union players
Rugby union props
Green Rockets Tokatsu players